Sanna Khanh Hoa Futsal Club (Vietnamese: câu lạc bộ futsal Sanna Khánh Hòa) is a Vietnamese Futsal club. They currently play in the Vietnam National Futsal League

Honours

Domestic Leagues
Vietnam National Futsal League
Champion(1):2015
 Runner-up (3):2013,2014,2016

Cup

Vietnamese National Futsal Cup 
 Runner-up (1):2018

Continental
AFC Futsal Club Championship
 Quarter-Final (1): 2016

Regional
AFF Futsal Club Championship
Runner-up(1): 2017

Continental record

Current players

See also
Sanna Khánh Hòa F.C.

Futsal clubs in Vietnam
Futsal clubs established in 2009
2009 establishments in Vietnam